The Chiappa M6 Survival Gun is an over and under combination gun that comes in four versions; with a 12 gauge or 20 gauge shotgun barrel over a .22 Long Rifle or .22 Magnum barrel. It has a similar appearance to the original M6 Aircrew Survival Weapon, with a unique skeletonized metal buttstock surrounding a polypropylene foam insert. It also uses double triggers and an enclosed firing mechanism.

In addition, it comes with "X Caliber" adapter sleeves that fit inside the shotgun barrels, allowing it to fire a wide range of handgun, rifle and shotgun ammunition.

Design
The Chiappa M6 is marketed to "outdoorsmen, ranchers, pilots or anyone who needs a portable, rugged and reliable rifle/shotgun combination."
It has a skeletonized metal buttstock that surrounds a polypropylene foam insert. The buttstock also holds two shotgun shells, five .22 rimfire cartridges and a cleaning kit. The design allows it to fold in half for more compact stowage. The shotgun barrels use interchangeable Remington type choke tubes and each barrel has own trigger. It uses a lever-action to cock the internal hammers and open the action. It has a tang safety located at the top rear (or "tang") of the receiver. It uses an M1 carbine-type rear sight and a fiber optic front sight. It also has Picatinny rails on the top and sides for mounting a wide range of sights, scopes, tac-lights, etc.

X Caliber
The Chiappa M6 comes with "X Caliber" adapter sleeves. The X Caliber consists of eight adapter sleeves that allow the 12-gauge models to fire .380 ACP, 9mm Luger, .38 Special, .357 Magnum, .40 S&W, .44 Special, .44 Magnum, .45 ACP, .45 Long Colt, .410 gauge and 20 gauge ammunition. There are also four adapter sleeves that allow the 20-gauge models to fire 9mm Luger, .38 Special, .357 Magnum, .45 ACP, .45 Long Colt, and .410 gauge ammunition. These adapter sleeves may also be purchased separately and used in any single- or double-barrel, 12- or 20 gauge break-action shotguns. The X caliber 12 gauge adapter sleeves even come in .22 Long Rifle, .223 Remington, 7.62x39mm and .308 Winchester as well.

See also
Springfield Armory M6 Scout
Chiappa Double Badger
Chiappa Little Badger
Chiappa Triple Crown

References

External links 
 Official website

.22 LR firearms
Chiappa Firearms
Combination guns
Multiple-barrel firearms
Rifles of Italy
Shotguns of Italy
Survival guns